Nové Butovice is a Prague Metro station on Line B, located in Stodůlky, Prague 13. It was opened on 26 October 1988 as the western terminus of the extension of the line from Smíchovské nádraží. On 11 November 1994 the line was extended further to Zličín.

References

External links
 Gallery and information (English)

Prague Metro stations
Railway stations opened in 1988
1988 establishments in Czechoslovakia
Railway stations in the Czech Republic opened in the 20th century